Uganda is divided into (from largest to smallest):
 4 administrative regions
 15 sub-regions
 121 districts. 
 146 counties, one city council, and thirteen municipalities
 sub-counties
 parishes and villages.

The sub-regions include, but are not necessarily limited to: Acholi, Ankole, Buganda, Bugisu, Bukedi, Bunyoro, Busoga, Elgon, Karamoja, Kigezi, Lango, Rwenzori, Sebei, Teso, Toro, and West Nile.

All the subdivisions are officially united and served by the national government body, the Uganda Local Governments Association (ULGA).

ISO 3166-2:UG gives three letter codes for the districts.

Parallel with the state administration, five traditional Bantu kingdoms  have some degree of mainly cultural autonomy. These kingdoms are Toro, Busoga, Bunyoro, Buganda, and Rwenzururu.

References 

 
Uganda
Uganda